The following elections occurred in the year 1903.

 1903 Liberian general election
 1903 Papal conclave

Africa
 1903 Cape Colony parliamentary election
 1903 Liberian general election

Asia
 1903 Japanese general election
 1903 Hong Kong sanitary board election

Europe

Denmark 
 1903 Danish Folketing election

Germany
 1903 German federal election

Norway
 1903 Norwegian parliamentary election

United Kingdom
 1903 Barnard Castle by-election
 1903 Dulwich by-election
 1903 East Perthshire by-election
 1903 Lewisham by-election
 1903 Newmarket by-election
 1903 Rochester by-election
 1903 South Meath by-election

Americas

Canada
1903 British Columbia general election
1903 Yukon general election
By-elections to the 9th Canadian Parliament
1903 Calgary municipal election
1903 Edmonton municipal election
1903 Manitoba general election
1903 New Brunswick general election

United States
 1902 and 1903 United States Senate elections
 in Alabama
 in Arkansas
 in California
 in Colorado
 in Connecticut
 in Delaware
 in Florida
 in Idaho
 in Illinois
 in Indiana
 in Kansas
 in Michigan
 in Missouri
 in Nevada
 in New Hampshire
 in New York
 in North Carolina
 in North Dakota
 in Oregon
 in Pennsylvania
 in South Carolina
 in South Dakota
 special election in South Dakota
 in Utah
 in Washington
 in Wisconsin
 1903 United States House of Representatives elections
 1903 Kansas's 7th congressional district special election
 1903 Ohio's 16th congressional district special election
 1903 Oregon's 1st congressional district special election
 1903 Pennsylvania's 4th congressional district special election
 1903 Texas's 8th congressional district special election
 gubernatorial elections
 1903 Iowa gubernatorial election
 1903 Kentucky gubernatorial election
 1903 Massachusetts gubernatorial election
 1903 Mississippi gubernatorial election
 1903 Ohio gubernatorial election
 1903 Rhode Island gubernatorial election

Peru
 1903 Peruvian presidential election

Oceania

Australia
 1903 East Sydney by-election 
 1903 New South Wales referendum 
 1903 Tasmanian state election
 1903 Armidale state by-election 
 1903 Australian federal election
 Chanter v Blackwood
 1903 Glen Innes state by-election
 Maloney v McEacharn
 1903 Tamworth state by-election

New Zealand
 1903 Invercargill mayoral election
 1903 Wellington City mayoral election

North America

Canada
 1903 British Columbia general election
 1903 Edmonton municipal election
 1903 Manitoba general election
 1903 New Brunswick general election
 1903 Yukon general election

United States
 1903 New York state election
 United States Senate election in New York, 1903

Oceania

Australia
 1903 Australian federal election

See also
 :Category:1903 elections

1903
Elections